Burdick West Peak rises to 455 m at the northwest extremity of Burdick Ridge in eastern Livingston Island.  The peak is partly ice-free.

The feature takes its name from Burdick Peak, the summit of the eponymous ridge.

Location

British mapping in 1968, detailed mapping by the Spanish Servicio Geográfico del Ejército in 1991. Co-ordinates, elevation and distances given according to a 1995-96 Bulgarian topographic survey.

Maps
 L.L. Ivanov et al. Antarctica: Livingston Island and Greenwich Island, South Shetland Islands. Scale 1:100000 topographic map. Sofia: Antarctic Place-names Commission of Bulgaria, 2005.
 L.L. Ivanov. Antarctica: Livingston Island and Greenwich, Robert, Snow and Smith Islands. Scale 1:120000 topographic map.  Troyan: Manfred Wörner Foundation, 2009.

References
 Burdick West Peak. SCAR Composite Gazetteer of Antarctica
 Bulgarian Antarctic Gazetteer. Antarctic Place-names Commission. (details in Bulgarian, basic data in English)

External links
 Burdick West Peak. Copernix satellite image

Mountains of Livingston Island